The Basilica dei Santi Giovanni e Paolo, known in Venetian as San Zanipolo, is a church in the Castello sestiere of Venice, Italy.

One of the largest churches in the city, it has the status of a minor basilica. After the 15th century the funeral services of all of Venice's doges were held here, and twenty-five doges are buried in the church.

Description
The huge brick edifice was designed in the Italian Gothic style, and completed in the 1430s. It is the principal Dominican church of Venice, and as such was built to hold large congregations. It is dedicated to John and Paul, not the Biblical Apostles of the same names, but two obscure martyrs of the Early Christian church in Rome, whose names were recorded in the 4th century but whose legend is of a later date.

In 1246, Doge Jacopo Tiepolo donated some swampland to the Dominicans after dreaming of a flock of white doves flying over it. The first church was demolished in 1333, when the current church was begun. It was not completed until 1430.

The vast interior contains many funerary monuments and paintings, as well as the Madonna della Pace, a miraculous Byzantine image situated in its own chapel in the south aisle, and a foot of Saint Catherine of Siena, the church's chief relic.

Santi Giovanni e Paolo is a parish church of the Vicariate of San Marco-Castello. Other churches of the parish are San Lazzaro dei Mendicanti, the Ospedaletto and the Beata Vergine Addolorata.

The Renaissance Equestrian Statue of Bartolomeo Colleoni (1483), by Andrea del Verrocchio, is located next to the church.

The belltower has 3 bells in D major.

Notable artists 
 Giovanni Bellini (Saint Vincent Ferrer Altarpiece in the south aisle)
 Bartolomeo Bon (the great west doorway)
 Cima da Conegliano or Giovanni Martini da Udine (Coronation of the Virgin in the south transept)
 Lorenzo Gramiccia (Madonna del Rosario in Capella di Trinita)
 Piero di Niccolò Lamberti and Giovanni di Martino (tomb of Doge Tommaso Mocenigo in the north aisle)
 Gregorio Lazzarini (sala S. Tommaso)
 Tullio Lombardo ( and Alessandro Leopardo?) ( on the north wall of the choir)
 Lorenzo Lotto (St Antoninus Giving Alms in the south transept)
 Rocco Marconi (Christ between SS Peter and Andrew in the south transept)
 Giuseppe Maria Mazza (five large bronze reliefs depicting the miracles of Saint Dominic in the Chapel of San Dominico)
 Giovanni Battista Piazzetta (St Dominic in Glory on the ceiling of the Capella di San Domenico)
 Alvise Tagliapietra, reliefs in the Chapel of the Rosary

 Veronese (The Assumption, The Annunciation and The Adoration of the Magi on the ceiling of the Capella del Rosario; The Adoration of the Shepherds in the Capella del Rosario).  The famous The Feast in the House of Levi, painted for the refectory, is now in the Accademia Gallery. 
 Alessandro Vittoria (St Jerome in the north aisle)
 Alvise Vivarini (Christ carrying the Cross in the sacristy)
 Bartolomeo Vivarini (Three Saints in the north aisle)

The Capella del Rosario (Chapel of the Rosary)
Built in 1582 to commemorate the victory of Lepanto, contained paintings by Tintoretto, Palma the Younger, Titian (The Assassination of Saint Peter Martyr) and Giovanni Bellini, among others, but they were destroyed in a fire in 1867 attributed to anti-Catholic arsonists.

Funerary monuments
After the 15th century the funeral services of all of Venice's doges were held in Santi Giovanni e Paolo. Twenty-five doges are buried in the church, including:
 Marino Zorzi (d. 1320): was buried in the ancient cloister. The exact spot where Marino and his wife Agneta (or Agnese) were buried was lost, so the friars affixed a commemorative plaque in the ancient cloister of the church.
 Jacopo Tiepolo (d. 1249)
 Marino Morosini (d. 1253)
 Reniero Zeno (d. 1268)
 Lorenzo Tiepolo (d. 1275)
 Giovanni Dolfin (d. 1361)
 Marco Cornaro (d. 1368)

 Michele Morosini (d. 1382)
 Antonio Venier (d. 1400)
 Michele Steno (d. 1413)
 Tommaso Mocenigo (d. 1423)
 Pasquale Malipiero (d. 1462)
 Nicolo Marcello (d. 1474)
 Pietro Mocenigo (d. 1476)
 Andrea Vendramin (d. 1478)

 Giovanni Mocenigo (d. 1485)
 Leonardo Loredan (d. 1521)
 Alvise I Mocenigo (d. 1577)
 Sebastiano Venier (d. 1578)
 Bertucci Valier (d. 1658)
 Silvestro Valier (d. 1700)

Other people buried in the church include:

 Orazio Baglioni (d. 1617), general
 Gentile Bellini (d. 1507), artist
 Giovanni Bellini (d. 1516), artist
 Gianbattista Bonzi (d. 1508), senator
 Bartolomeo Bragadin (poet)
 Marco Antonio Bragadin (d.1571), general, flayed alive by the Turks - the tomb contains only his skin
 Jacopo Cavalli (d. 1384), general
 Alvise Diedo, commander-in-chief 
 Marino Faliero (d. 1355), the 55th Doge of Venice, beheaded
 Marco Giustiniani (d. 1346), sea captain
 Pompeo Giustiniani (d. 1616), condottiere
 Palma the Younger (d. 1628), artist

 Vettor Pisani (d. 1380), admiral
 Niccolò Orsini, (d. 1510), commander-in-chief 
 Leonardo da Prato (d.1511), condottiere
 Alvise Trevisan (d. 1528)
 Edward Windsor, 3rd Baron Windsor (d. 1574)
 Vincenzo Benedetti, (d. 1658)

See also

Italian Gothic architecture
List of Doges of Venice
Lost artworks
Sant'Anastasia (Verona) — similar Dominican church in Verona.
History of medieval Arabic and Western European domes
 List of buildings and structures in Venice
 List of churches in Venice

References

External links

  
 

 
Roman Catholic churches completed in 1430
Giovanni
Giovanni e Paolo
Dominican churches
Gothic architecture in Venice
Churches in Castello, Venice
Church buildings with domes
Minor basilicas in Veneto